Stângăceaua is a commune located in Mehedinți County, Oltenia, Romania. It is composed of eight villages: Bârlogeni, Breznicioara, Cerânganul, Fața Motrului, Poșta Veche, Satu Mare, Stângăceaua and Târsa.

References

Communes in Mehedinți County
Localities in Oltenia